Albin Kitzinger (1 February 1912 in Schweinfurt – 6 August 1970) was a German football player. He played his whole career for 1. FC Schweinfurt 05.

Career 
On the national level he played for Germany national team (44 matches/2 goals), and was a participant at the 1938 FIFA World Cup. He was a member of the Breslau Eleven that beat Denmark 8–0 in Breslau in 1937 and went on to win 10 out of 11 games played during that year.

Kitzinger distinguished himself with assuredness on the ball and the calmness in which he distributed the ball. Together with Andreas Kupfer and Ludwig Goldbrunner he formed one of the best halves trios of the late-1930s. In 1937 he was called up to represent Western Europe in Amsterdam against Central Europe, and a year later he was selected to play in a FIFA Europe XI against England at Highbury Stadium. Altogether he starred in 826 games for his club Schweinfurt 05. He died at the age of 58 after a long and severe illness.

Honours

Club 
 Gauliga Bayern 
 Champion: (2) 1938–39, 1941–42
 Runner-up: (2) 1936–37, 1942–43
 Tschammerpokal
 Semi-finalist: 1936

Individual 
 Europe XI selection: 1938

Footnotes

References 
 Weltfussball  
 Albin Kitzinger - International Appearances

1912 births
1970 deaths
People from Schweinfurt
Sportspeople from Lower Franconia
German footballers
Germany international footballers
1938 FIFA World Cup players
1. FC Schweinfurt 05 players
Association football midfielders
Footballers from Bavaria